Jesse Thomas was a 23-year-old, African-American man who was murdered in Waco, McLennan County, Texas by Sam Harris on May 26, 1922. A large mob then seized the body from the undertaker and burnt it in Waco's public square. The lynching of Jesse Thomas was the 10th lynching in 20-days in Texas and according to the United States Senate Committee on the Judiciary it was the 30th of 61 lynchings during 1922 in the United States.

Background

Jesse Thomas was a service car driver, married and lived in South Waco. 

On early Friday, May 26, 1922, 25-years-old, W. Harry Bolton was driving with, 26-years-old, Mrs. Maggie Hays. During their drive a man carjacked, and murdered Bolton. Maggie Hays told investigators that the assailant was going to shoot her too but his gun jammed. The man then told Maggie the attack was in revenge for the 9 lynchings of African-Americans in Texas in the last 20 days. The man then left the scene by jumping on a passing cargo train. Maggie Hays went to police and gave them a description of her assailant. Due to the extreme nature of the crime, Waco Chief of Police Jenkins deputized a number of citizens to help out in the investigation.

Killing of Jesse Thomas

E.L. McClure, a telegraph operator, was one of those who had been deputized as an officer of the law. He was driving with his wife when he saw Jesse Thomas, who he thought met the description of the person who attacked Bolton and Maggie Hays. To get him in the car, McClure told Jesse Thomas that he had some work cutting grass. Once Jesse Thomas was in McClure's car, on his own initiative, McClure took Jesse to the home of Maggie Hays. When Maggie saw Jesse she shouted to her father Sam Harris, "That's the man, papa." At 5:15 PM, in a fit of rage, Harris shot Jesse Thomas seven times as Thomas desperately tried to escape the house. Thomas with multiple bullet wounds died on the house's steps to the backyard. The body was then taken to the local undertaker.

Burning of the body

News of the shooting had quickly spread throughout the region and thousands began pouring into the downtown area. A mob of 6,000 people pushed their way into the funeral parlour where Jesse's body was sent after being killed by Sam Harris. The corpse was yanked out of the funeral parlour, tied to a truck and dragged through Waco on Franklin Ave. Some of the mob had prepared a large pyre, of cordwood, in the public square, behind the City Hall. When the truck dragging the corpse arrived they threw the body on the pyre and lit it on fire. After the fire died down they again tied the corpse to a truck and dragged it through the Black part of town. As the burnt body was being tied to the truck members of the white mob scrambled to break off fingers and other appendages from the charred skeleton as souvenirs.

Aftermath

Earlier in the day, Constable Leslie Stegall had arrested a Black man that met the description of the attacker given by Maggie Hays, Sank Johnson. Chief of Police Jenkins thought that Johnson was guilty of the crime as his shoes matched the imprints left at the crime scene. In addition to Johnson there were four other men in the jail that matched the description given by Maggie. The Texas Rangers were called in to protect these suspects from the lynch mob. 

The family of Jesse Thomas proclaimed his innocence and presented compelling evidence that he was at home with them at the time of the carjacking and assault of Maggie Hays. 

Sam Harris, the man who publicly claimed to have shot Jesse Thomas, offered to surrender to the authorities but they refused to press charges for the murder of Jesse Thomas.

National memorial 

The National Memorial for Peace and Justice, in Montgomery, Alabama, displays 805 hanging steel rectangles, each representing the counties in the United States where a documented lynching took place and, for each county, the names of those lynched. The memorial hopes that communities, like McLennan County, Texas where Jesse Thomas was lynched, will take their slab and install it in their own community.

Annotations

References 
Notes

Bibliography 

1922 riots
1922 in Texas
African-American history of Texas
Lynching deaths in Texas
February 1922 events
Protest-related deaths
Racially motivated violence against African Americans
Riots and civil disorder in Texas
White American riots in the United States